Relief in Abstract is an independent music and arts label based in Orlando, Florida.  The label was started as a musical collective in 2011 by Lex Johnson and Jered Dowden while they were in high school, originally as a platform to promote their friends' music. XXYYXX quickly gathered a strong online following and helped to elevate the status of the label overall. The label's brand and website were designed by Guillermo Casanova. Relief In Abstract announced the addition of indie band Out Go the Lights to their roster in September 2013.

Artists

 XXYYXX
 Fortune Howl
 Spies On Bikes
 Marble
 Out Go the Lights

See also
 List of record labels

References

External links
 Official website

American independent record labels